Jovica Nikolić (Serbian Cyrillic: Јовица Николић; born 11 July 1959) is a Serbian retired footballer who played as a central midfielder, and a manager.

Club career
Nikolić was born in Svetozarevo, Socialist Federal Republic of Yugoslavia. In his country, he played for FK Jagodina and Red Star Belgrade; he won two leagues and one cup with the latter, scoring a career-best eight goals in 22 games in his first season en route to the national championship, but being rarely used in his last two years combined (only 14 league appearances).

In the summer of 1989, aged 30, Nikolić was allowed to leave the country and signed for S.C. Salgueiros in Portugal, helping the club promote to the Primeira Liga in his first season. In the following campaign the Paranhos side overachieved for a final fifth place, with the subsequent qualification to the UEFA Cup – a first-ever– with the player netting six goals in 36 matches; during most of his spell there, he shared teams with countrymen Čedomir Đoinčević and Stevan Milovac.

Nikolić retired from football at 36 years of age, after two seasons with F.C. Maia in the Portuguese third division. In late May 2008 he had his first coaching experience, being appointed at FC Ordabasy in Kazakhstan.

International career
Nikolić won one cap for Yugoslavia, starting in a 1–2 home loss against East Germany for the 1986 FIFA World Cup qualifiers, on 28 September 1985 (match played in Belgrade).

Previously, in 1984, he played Olympic football, appearing in five games out of six and scoring three goals as the national team finished third in Los Angeles.

Honours

Club
Red Star 
Yugoslav First League: 1983–84, 1987–88
Yugoslav Cup: 1984–85

Salgueiros
Segunda Liga: 1989–90

Country
Yugoslavia
Summer Olympic Games: Bronze medal 1984

References

External links

1959 births
Living people
Yugoslav footballers
Serbian footballers
Association football midfielders
Yugoslav First League players
FK Jagodina players
Red Star Belgrade footballers
Primeira Liga players
Liga Portugal 2 players
Segunda Divisão players
S.C. Salgueiros players
F.C. Maia players
Yugoslavia international footballers
Footballers at the 1984 Summer Olympics
Olympic footballers of Yugoslavia
Olympic bronze medalists for Yugoslavia
Olympic medalists in football
Medalists at the 1984 Summer Olympics
Serbian expatriate footballers
Expatriate footballers in Portugal
Serbian expatriate sportspeople in Portugal
Serbian football managers
FC Ordabasy managers
FK Jedinstvo Bijelo Polje managers
Serbian expatriate football managers
Expatriate football managers in Kazakhstan
Serbian expatriate sportspeople in Kazakhstan
Expatriate football managers in Montenegro
Serbian expatriate sportspeople in Montenegro